Southwest Allen County Schools is a school district in Indiana serving both Aboite and Lafayette Township residents of Allen County, including those township area incorporated into Fort Wayne.

It has six neighborhood elementary schools, two middle schools, and one high school.  Its current superintendent is Dr. Park D. Ginder.  Elementary students are sometimes taken on field trips to the Center School, a historic one-room schoolhouse in the district, and the chief symbol of the district, they may also visit the Allen County Courthouse, in order to learn about our local judiciary system.

Schools
Aboite Elementary School
Covington Elementary School
Deer Ridge Elementary School
Haverhill Elementary School
Homestead High School
Lafayette Meadows Elementary School
Summit Middle School
Whispering Meadows Elementary School
Woodside Middle School

See also
List of school districts in Indiana

External links
Southwest Allen County Schools

School districts in Indiana
Education in Allen County, Indiana